Hearst Randolph "Randy" Duncan, Jr. (March 15, 1937 – September 27, 2016) was an American gridiron football quarterback and lawyer.

He played college football at the University of Iowa in the Big Ten Conference. He played in two Rose Bowls (January 1957, 1959) and was inducted into the College Football Hall of Fame (1997). Duncan was the first overall pick in the 1959 NFL Draft by the Green Bay Packers, but played professionally for Canadian Football League's BC Lions and the American Football League's Dallas Texans.

Early years
Duncan was born to Hearst and Louise Duncan in 1937, in Osage, Iowa. He moved with his family to Mason City before finally attending Roosevelt High School in Des Moines. Duncan was a highly regarded prospect in both football and basketball. He was a first team all-state guard on the Roosevelt basketball team that lost in the 1954 state championship game. Duncan was a first team all-state quarterback for Roosevelt, leading the Roughriders to an undefeated season and a state title in 1954. The teams only lost two games in his three years there.

Duncan graduated from high school after the 1954 fall semester, and he was heavily recruited after choosing to play football. He nearly went to the University of Colorado in Boulder, but decided to attend the University of Iowa in Iowa City. Duncan has said that the only reason was because of his friendship with Iowa assistant coach Bump Elliott.

College career
His college career got off to a slow start. As a mid-year graduate and due to freshman ineligibility, Duncan had to wait one and a half years to play, joining Iowa in the spring of 1955 but seeing his first action as a sophomore in the fall of 1956. Duncan became very discouraged over being constantly berated by Iowa coach Forest Evashevski and being clobbered in practice by Cal Jones. "Time after time, I was going to quit and transfer to Iowa State," Duncan has said.

But Duncan managed to win the backup quarterback job in 1956, playing behind Ken Ploen. In a non-conference game against Oregon State, Duncan led Iowa to two fourth-quarter touchdowns and a 14-13 win after Ploen was injured. Iowa qualified for the Rose Bowl that season, and the opponent was again Oregon State. Duncan played the second quarter following a Ploen injury and led Iowa to a touchdown in Iowa's 35-19 win.

Duncan was named the starter and led the team in passing in 1957. He battled snow and sleet to throw a touchdown pass for the only score in Iowa's win over Northwestern, and he missed the end of Iowa's tie with Michigan due to leg cramps. Duncan scored four touchdowns, two passing and two rushing, against Minnesota, and two touchdowns against Notre Dame, one passing and one on an interception return as a defensive back. Iowa went 7-1-1 on the season, and Duncan was named first team All-Big Ten.

As a senior in 1958, Duncan led Iowa to one of its best seasons ever. After a surprising early season tie against Air Force, Iowa won five straight Big Ten games, clinching the Big Ten title as early as it had ever been clinched before. Duncan was terrific, helping Iowa lead the Big Ten in passing and the nation in total offense. He led the nation in completion percentage and passing yardage. His greatest game may have been in Iowa's lone loss in 1958, when he set a Big Ten record with 23 completions in 33 tries for 249 yards in a 38–28 loss to Ohio State. Duncan led Iowa to another Big Ten title and a 38–12 victory in the Rose Bowl. His lone touchdown pass in the Rose Bowl broke the school record for touchdown passes in a season, which had been held by Nile Kinnick in 1939.

Duncan was named first team All-Big Ten. He was also named the 1958 Big Ten MVP, and he was selected as a consensus first team All-American. He won the Walter Camp Award and finished second in the Heisman Trophy balloting. Duncan is one of seven Iowa players to letter from 1956 through 1958.

Upon being voted Iowa's MVP, Duncan said, "There's nobody that knows any better than I do that this was all made possible by you guys here and the coaching staff behind me. I mean it. Just to be a part of this ball club was all that I really ever wanted."

Professional Football career
Duncan was the first overall selection of the 1959 NFL Draft, taken by the Green Bay Packers on December 1, 1958. He never played for the Packers, however. Duncan instead went to the Canadian Football League and signed with the British Columbia Lions. He later explained, "That was Green Bay before Vince Lombardi (hired two months after the draft), and Canada offered a lot more dough."

Duncan played two disappointing years in Canada before getting cut and then signing with the American Football League's Dallas Texans (now the Kansas City Chiefs). He practiced with the Texans during the day and attended Southern Methodist University law school at night. Duncan did not see much playing time for the Texans, and when Texans coach Hank Stram traded for Len Dawson, Duncan retired from football.

After football
Duncan finished law school at Drake University, and for years, operated a successful law practice in Des Moines. Duncan married Paula Mathieson in 1960, and they have three sons: Jed, Matt and Scott. Jed and Matt Duncan played football at Yale University and the University of Iowa, respectively. Two of Randy Duncan's grandsons, Cole and Kyle Duncan, played football at Bowdoin College. Duncan died in Des Moines on September 27, 2016 from brain cancer.

Honors
Duncan was inducted into the Iowa Sports Hall of Fame in 1976 and the College Football Hall of Fame in 1997. In 1999, Sports Illustrated selected Randy Duncan as the 28th greatest sports figure in the history of the state of Iowa. Duncan was named honorary captain of the Iowa football team during the Iowa - Maine football game in 2008.

See also
 List of American Football League players
 List of college football yearly passing leaders

References

External links

1937 births
2016 deaths
People from Mason City, Iowa
People from Osage, Iowa
Players of American football from Des Moines, Iowa
American football quarterbacks
Iowa Hawkeyes football players
All-American college football players
College Football Hall of Fame inductees
National Football League first-overall draft picks
American players of Canadian football
Canadian football quarterbacks
BC Lions players
Dallas Texans (AFL) players
Iowa lawyers
Southern Methodist University alumni
Deaths from brain cancer in the United States
20th-century American lawyers
Theodore Roosevelt High School (Iowa) alumni
Drake University Law School alumni